Lucas Piasentin (born 17 March 1986) is a Brazilian professional footballer who plays as a defender for Associação Desportiva Ka I.

Career
Born in Londrina, Lucas Piasentin made his first football steps at Paraná Soccer Technical Center (PSTC), before joining the youth system of Atlético Paranaense. He made his debut for the first team during the 2007 Campeonato Paranaense, before spending some time on loan with Rio Branco and Fortaleza. In the following years, Lucas Piasentin played with Horizonte, making his Campeonato Brasileiro Série C debut (2008), as well as with Portuguesa Londrinense, PSTC and Angra dos Reis in the lower state leagues (between 2009 and 2012).

In the summer of 2012, Lucas Piasentin signed a contract with Portuguese club União da Madeira. He scored three goals in 33 appearances in the 2012–13 Segunda Liga season.

In June 2013, Lucas Piasentin moved to Serbia and signed with SuperLiga newcomers Čukarički. He was a member of the team that won the 2014–15 Serbian Cup, the first major trophy in the club's history.

After playing in Serbia until early 2017, he moved back to Brazil at start of the year, and played with Espírito Santo in Campeonato Brasileiro Série D in 2018 and next with Atlético Itapemirim. At the beginning of 2019 he joined Windsor Arch Ka I jogando na Liga de Elite de Macau.

Honours
Fortaleza
 Campeonato Cearense: 2008

Čukarički
 Serbian Cup: 2014–15

References

External links
 Lucas Piasentin at playmakerstats.com (English version of ogol.com.br and zerozero.pt)
 
 
 

Associação Portuguesa Londrinense players
Association football defenders
Brazilian expatriate footballers
Brazilian expatriate sportspeople in Portugal
Brazilian expatriate sportspeople in Serbia
Brazilian footballers
Campeonato Brasileiro Série C players
C.F. União players
Club Athletico Paranaense players
Expatriate footballers in Portugal
Expatriate footballers in Macau
Expatriate footballers in Serbia
FK Čukarički players
Fortaleza Esporte Clube players
Sportspeople from Londrina
Rio Branco Sport Club players
Horizonte Futebol Clube players
Windsor Arch Ka I players
Liga Portugal 2 players
Serbian SuperLiga players
1986 births
Living people